FM-2030 (born Fereidoun M. Esfandiary; ; October 15, 1930 – July 8, 2000) was a Belgian-born Iranian-American author, teacher, transhumanist philosopher, futurist, consultant, and Olympic athlete.

He became notable as a transhumanist with the book Are You a Transhuman?: Monitoring and Stimulating Your Personal Rate of Growth in a Rapidly Changing World, published in 1989. In addition, he wrote a number of works of fiction under his original name F. M. Esfandiary.

Early life and education
FM-2030 was born Fereydoon M. Esfandiary on October 15, 1930 in Belgium to Iranian diplomat Abdol-Hossein “A. H.” Sadigh Esfandiary (1894–1986), who served from 1920 to 1960. He travelled widely as a child, having lived in 17 countries including Iran, India, and Afghanistan, by age 11. He represented Iran as a basketball player and wrestler at the 1948 Olympic Games in London. He attended primary school in Iran and England and completed his secondary education at Colleges Des Freres, a Jesuit school in Jerusalem. By the time he was 18, aside from his native Persian, he learned to speak 4 languages: Arabic, Hebrew, French and English. He then started his college education at the University of California, Berkeley, but later transferred to the University of California, Los Angeles, where he graduated in 1952. Afterwards, he served on the United Nations Conciliation Commission for Palestine from 1952 to 1954.

Name change and views
In 1970, after publishing his book Optimism One, F. M. Esfandiary started going by FM-2030 for two main reasons: firstly, to reflect the hope and belief that he would live to celebrate his 100th birthday in 2030; secondly, and more importantly, to break free of the widespread practice of naming conventions that he saw as rooted in a collectivist mentality, and existing only as a relic of humankind's tribalistic past. He formalized his name change in 1988. He viewed traditional names as almost always stamping a label of collective identity – varying from gender to nationality – on the individual, thereby existing as prima facie elements of thought processes in the human cultural fabric, that tended to degenerate into stereotyping, factionalism, and discrimination. In his own words, "Conventional names define a person's past: ancestry, ethnicity, nationality, religion. I am not who I was ten years ago and certainly not who I will be in twenty years. [...] The name 2030 reflects my conviction that the years around 2030 will be a magical time. In 2030 we will be ageless and everyone will have an excellent chance to live forever. 2030 is a dream and a goal." As a staunch anti-nationalist, he believed "There are no illegal immigrants, only irrelevant borders."

In 1973, he published a political manifesto UpWingers: A Futurist Manifesto in which he portrays both the ideological left and right as outdated, and in their place proposes a schema of UpWingers (those who look to the sky and the future) and DownWingers (those who look to the earth and the past). FM-2030 identified with the former. He argued that the nuclear family structure and the idea of a city would disappear, being replaced by modular social communities he called mobilia, powered by communitarianism, which would persist and then disappear.

FM-2030 believed that synthetic body parts would one day make life expectancy irrelevant; shortly before his death from pancreatic cancer, he described the pancreas as "a stupid, dumb, wretched organ."

In terms of civilization, he stated: "No civilization of the past was great. They were all primitive and persecutory, founded on mass subjugation and mass murder." In terms of identity, he stated "The young modern is not losing his identity. He is gladly disencumbering himself of it." He believed that eventually, nations would disappear and that identities would shift from cultural to personal. In a 1972 op-Ed in The New York Times, he wrote that the leadership in the Arab–Israeli conflict had failed, and that the warring sides were "acting like adolescents, refuse to resolve their wasteful 25-year-old brawl" and believed that the world was "irreversibly evolving beyond the concept of national homeland."

Personal life
He was a lifelong vegetarian and said he would not eat anything that had a mother. He famously refused to answer any questions about his nationality, age and upbringing, claiming that such questions were irrelevant and that he was a “global person”. FM-2030 once said, "I am a 21st century person who was accidentally launched in the 20th. I have a deep nostalgia for the future." As he spent much of his childhood in India, he was noted to have spoken English with a slight Indian accent. He taught at The New School, University of California, Los Angeles, and Florida International University. He worked as a corporate consultant for Lockheed and J. C. Penney. He was also an atheist.
FM-2030 was, in his own words, a follower of "upwing" politics (i.e. neither right-wing nor left-wing but something else), and by which he meant that he endorsed universal progress. He had been in a non-exclusive "friendship" (his preferred term for relationship) with Flora Schnall, a lawyer and fellow Harvard Law Class of 1959 graduate, from the 1960s until his death. FM-2030 and Schnall attended the same class as Ruth Bader Ginsburg. He resided in Westwood, Los Angeles as well as Miami.

Death
FM-2030 died on July 8, 2000 from pancreatic cancer at a friend’s apartment in Manhattan. He was placed in cryonic suspension at the Alcor Life Extension Foundation in Scottsdale, Arizona, where his body remains today. He did not yet have remote standby arrangements, so no Alcor team member was present at his death, but FM-2030 was the first person to be vitrified, rather than simply frozen as previous cryonics patients had been. FM-2030 was survived by four sisters and one brother.

Published works
Fiction
The Day of Sacrifice (1959) available as an eBook
The Beggar (1965)
Identity Card (1966) available as an eBook

Non-fiction
Optimism one; the emerging radicalism (1970)
UpWingers: A Futurist Manifesto (1973) (pbk.) Available as an eBook ISBN FW00007527, Publisher: e-reads, Pub. Date: Jan 1973, File Size: 153K
Telespheres (1977)
Are You a Transhuman?: Monitoring and Stimulating Your Personal Rate of Growth in a Rapidly Changing World (1989).

Cultural references
 In Dan Brown's novel Inferno, transhumanist characters who admire FM-2030 pay tribute to him by adopting his naming convention and taking names such as FS2080.
 Several musical artists, such as the Reptaliens, Dataport, Ghosthack, Vorja, Gavin Osborn and Philip Sumner have created songs and albums named after FM-2030.
 A film titled 2030 released in 2020, which explored the possibility of FM-2030's future revival.

See also
 Blue skies research
 Steve Fuller
 Breakthrough Institute
 Proactionary Principle
 Transhumanist politics
 Bright green environmentalism
 Lifeboat Foundation
 Space colonization
 Colonization of Mars

References

External links

Intimacy in a Fluid World, by F.M. Esfandiary
NPR story about FM-2030
Ilija Trojanow on F.M. Esfandiary: Searching for Identity in Iran's Labyrinthine Bureaucracy
"Are You a Transhuman?: Monitoring and Stimulating Your Personal Rate of Growth in a Rapidly Changing World" (PDF)
 FM-2030 interview on CNN Larry King Live, in 1990
 Upwingers website
 Up-wingers page at hpluspedia

1930 births
2000 deaths
Cryonically preserved people
Deaths from pancreatic cancer
Florida International University faculty
Futurologists
Iranian atheists
Esfandiary
Iranian emigrants to the United States
Iranian writers
Esfandiary
Esfandiary
Writers from Miami
The New School faculty
Life extensionists
University of California, Los Angeles faculty
Iranian transhumanists
American atheists
American transhumanists
Deaths from cancer in New York (state)